Belgium competed at the 1988 Summer Olympics in Seoul, South Korea. 59 competitors, 35 men and 24 women, took part in 65 events in 16 sports.

Medalists

Competitors
The following is the list of number of competitors in the Games.

Archery

In the fifth appearance of Belgium at the Olympic archery contest, the nation returned to sending just men.  The three men placed 15th in the team round, with Paul Vermeiren leading the individual rankings with a 17th place.

Men's Individual Competition:
 Paul Vermeiren — Quarterfinals (→ 17th place)
 Patrick DeKoning — Preliminary Round (→ 44th place)
 Francis Noteboom — Preliminary Round (→ 53rd place)

Men's Team Competition:
 Vermeiren, DeKoning, and Noteboom — Preliminary Round (→ 15th place)

Athletics

Men's 3.000m Steeplechase
 William Van Dijck
 Heat — 8:36.80
 Semi Final — 8:15.63
 Final — 8:13.99 (→ 5th place)

Men's 20 km Walk
 Godfried Dejonckheere
 Final — 1:27:14 (→ 35th place)

Men's 50 km Walk
 Godfried Dejonckheere
 Final — did not finish (→ no ranking)

Women's Marathon 
 Magda Ilands
 Final — 2:38:02 (→ 35th place)
 Agnes Pardaens
 Final — did not finish (→ no ranking)

Women's Heptathlon 
 Jacqueline Hautenauve
 Final Result — 5734 points (→ 20th place)

Canoeing

Cycling

Six cyclists, four men and two women, represented Belgium in 1988.

Men's road race
 Jan Mattheus
 Johnny Dauwe
 Frank Francken

Men's sprint
 Erik Schoefs

Women's road race
 Kristel Werckx — 2:00:52 (→ 23rd place)
 Agnes Dusart — 2:00:52 (→ 36th place)

Diving

Equestrianism

Fencing

Two fencers, both men, represented Belgium in 1988.

Men's foil
 Thierry Soumagne

Men's épée
 Stefan Joos
 Thierry Soumagne

Gymnastics

Judo

Rhythmic gymnastics

Rowing

Shooting

Swimming

Men's 100m Freestyle
 Jean-Marie Arnould
 Heat – 52.26 (→ did not advance, 34th place)

Men's 200m Freestyle
 Jean-Marie Arnould
 Heat – 1:53.73 (→ did not advance, 33rd place)

Men's 400m Freestyle
 Jean-Marie Arnould
 Heat – 3:59.91 (→ did not advance, 29th place)

Men's 100m Breaststroke
 Sidney Appelboom
 Heat – 1:05.21 (→ did not advance, 33rd place)
 Luc Van de Vondel
 Heat – 1:06.24 (→ did not advance, 45th place)

Men's 200m Breaststroke
 Sidney Appelboom
 Heat – 2:18.02
 B-Final – 2:18.08 (→ 11th place)
 Luc Van de Vondel
 Heat – 2:21.50 (→ did not advance, 28th place)

Men's 200m Butterfly
 Jean-Marie Arnould
 Heat – 2:03.76 (→ did not advance, 25th place)

Men's 200m Individual Medley
 Sidney Appelboom
 Heat – 2:11.50 (→ did not advance, 33rd place)

Women's 200m Freestyle
 Isabelle Arnould
 Heat – 2:03.32 (→ did not advance, 18th place)

Women's 400m Freestyle
 Isabelle Arnould
 Heat – 4:11.71
 Final – 4:11.73 (→ 6th place)
 Christelle Janssens
 Heat – 4:19.95 (→ did not advance, 25th place)

Women's 800m Freestyle
 Isabelle Arnould
 Heat – 8:34.56
 Final – 8:37.47 (→ 7th place)
 Christelle Janssens
 Heat – 8:51.22 (→ did not advance, 20th place)

Women's 100m Breaststroke
 Ingrid Lempereur
 Heat – 1:11.00
 B-Final – 1:10.86 (→ 11th place)
 Brigitte Becue
 Heat – 1:12.90 (→ did not advance, 21st place)

Women's 200m Breaststroke
 Ingrid Lempereur
 Heat – 2:30.07
 Final – 2:29.42 (→ 6th place)
 Brigitte Becue
 Heat – 2:33.13
 B-Final – 2:34.10 (→ 16th place)

Women's 200m Individual Medley
 Isabelle Arnould
 Heat – 2:20.74 (→ did not advance, 24th place)

Synchronized swimming

One synchronized swimmer represented Belgium in 1988.

Women's solo
 Patricia Serneels

Table tennis

Wrestling

References

Nations at the 1988 Summer Olympics
1988
Olympics